The House of Tudor was a royal house of largely Welsh and English  origin that held the English throne from 1485 to 1603. They descended from the Tudors of Penmynydd and Catherine of France. Tudor monarchs ruled the Kingdom of England and its realms, including their ancestral Wales and the Lordship of Ireland (later the Kingdom of Ireland) for 118 years with five monarchs: Henry VII, Henry VIII, Edward VI, Mary I and Elizabeth I. The Tudors succeeded the House of Plantagenet as rulers of the Kingdom of England, and were succeeded by the House of Stuart. The first Tudor monarch, Henry VII of England, descended through his mother from a legitimised branch of the English royal House of Lancaster, a cadet house of the Plantagenets. The Tudor family rose to power and started the Tudor period in the wake of the Wars of the Roses (1455–1487), which left the main House of Lancaster (with which the Tudors were aligned) extinct in the male line.

Henry VII succeeded in presenting himself as a candidate not only for traditional Lancastrian supporters, but also for discontented supporters of their rival Plantagenet cadet House of York, and he took the throne by right of conquest. Following his victory at the Battle of Bosworth Field (22 August 1485), he reinforced his position in 1486 by fulfilling his 1483 vow to marry Elizabeth of York, daughter of Edward IV, thus symbolically uniting the former warring factions of Lancaster and York under the new dynasty (represented by the Tudor rose). The Tudors extended their power beyond modern England, achieving the full union of England and the Principality of Wales in 1542 (Laws in Wales Acts 1535 and 1542), and successfully asserting English authority over the Kingdom of Ireland (proclaimed by the Crown of Ireland Act 1542). They also maintained the nominal English claim to the Kingdom of France; although none of them made substance of it, Henry VIII fought wars with France trying to reclaim that title. After him, his daughter Mary I lost control of all territory in France permanently with the fall of Calais in 1558.

In total, the Tudor monarchs ruled their domains for just over a century. Henry VIII was the only son of Henry VII to live to the age of maturity. Issues around royal succession (including marriage and the succession rights of women) became major political themes during the Tudor era, as did the English Reformation in religion, impacting the future of the Crown. When Elizabeth I died childless, the Scottish House of Stuart succeeded as England's royal family through the Union of the Crowns of 24 March 1603. The first Stuart to become King of England, James VI and I, descended from Henry VII's daughter Margaret Tudor, who in 1503 had married King James IV of Scotland in accordance with the 1502 Treaty of Perpetual Peace.

Ascent to the throne 
The Tudors descended from King Edward III on Henry VII's mother's side from John Beaufort, 1st Earl of Somerset, one of the children of the 14th century English prince John of Gaunt, the third surviving son of Edward III. Beaufort's mother was Gaunt's long-term mistress Katherine Swynford.

The descendants of an illegitimate child of English royalty would normally have no claim on the throne, although Gaunt and Swynford eventually married in 1396, when John Beaufort was 25. The church then retroactively declared the Beauforts legitimate by way of a papal bull the same year, confirmed by an Act of Parliament in 1397. A subsequent proclamation by John of Gaunt's son by his earlier wife Blanche of Lancaster, King Henry IV, also recognised the Beauforts' legitimacy but declared the line ineligible for the throne.

Nevertheless, the Beauforts remained closely allied with Gaunt's descendants from his first marriage, the House of Lancaster, during the civil wars known as the Wars of the Roses. However the descent from the Beauforts, did not necessarily render Henry Tudor (Henry VII) heir to the throne, nor did the fact that his father's mother, Catherine of Valois, had been a Queen of England (although, this did make Henry VII the son of King Henry VI's half-brother).

The legitimate claim was that of Henry Tudor's wife, Elizabeth of York, as daughter to Edward IV, and descendant of the second son of Edward III, Lionel, Duke of Clarence, and also his fourth son, Edmund, Duke of York. As she had no surviving brothers, Elizabeth had the strongest claim to the crown, but while she became queen consort, she did not rule as queen regnant; for the last attempt a female made at ruling in her own right had resulted in disaster when Henry II's mother, Empress Matilda, and Henry II's uncle, Stephen, King of England, fought bitterly for the throne in the 12th century.

Family connections and the Wars of the Roses

Sources:

Henry Tudor had, however, something that the others did not. He had an army which defeated the last Yorkist king, Richard III, in the field of battle and the support of powerful nobles to take the crown by right of conquest. How Richard III had come to the throne proved controversial, even among powerful Yorkists.

Henry Tudor, as Henry VII, and his son by Elizabeth of York, Henry VIII, eliminated other claimants to the throne, including his first cousin once removed, Margaret Pole, Countess of Salisbury, and her family. Only Reginald Pole survived, but he was a cardinal in the Catholic Church, with no heirs. He later became Archbishop of Canterbury under Henry VIII's Catholic daughter, Mary I.

On 1 November 1455, John Beaufort's granddaughter, Margaret Beaufort, Countess of Richmond and Derby, married Henry VI's maternal half-brother Edmund Tudor, 1st Earl of Richmond. It was his father, Owen Tudor, who abandoned the Welsh patronymic naming practice and adopted a fixed surname. When he did, he did not choose, as was generally the custom, his father's name, Maredudd, but chose that of his grandfather, Tudur ap Goronwy, instead.

This name is sometimes given as Tewdwr, the Welsh form of Theodore, but Modern Welsh Tudur, Old Welsh Tutir is originally not a variant but a different and completely unrelated name, etymologically identical with Gaulish Toutorix, from Proto-Celtic *toutā "people, tribe" and *rīxs "king" (compare Modern Welsh tud "territory" and rhi "king" respectively), corresponding to Germanic Theodoric.

Owen Tudor was one of the bodyguards for the queen dowager Catherine of Valois, whose husband, Henry V, had died in 1422. Evidence suggests that the two were secretly married in 1429. The two sons born of the marriage, Edmund and Jasper, were among the most loyal supporters of the House of Lancaster in its struggle against the House of York.

Henry VI ennobled his half-brothers: Edmund became Earl of Richmond on 15 December 1449
and was married to Lady Margaret Beaufort, the great-granddaughter of John of Gaunt, the progenitor of the house of Lancaster; Jasper became Earl of Pembroke on 23 November 1452. Edmund died on 3 November 1456. On 28 January 1457, his widow Margaret, who had just attained her fourteenth birthday, gave birth to a son, Henry Tudor, at her brother-in-law's Pembroke Castle.

Henry Tudor, the future Henry VII, spent his childhood at Raglan Castle, the home of William Herbert, Earl of Pembroke, a leading Yorkist. Following the murder of Henry VI and death of his son, Edward, in 1471, Henry became the person upon whom the Lancastrian cause rested. Concerned for his young nephew's life, Jasper Tudor took Henry to Brittany for safety.

Lady Margaret remained in England and remarried, living quietly while advancing the Lancastrian (and her son's) cause. Capitalizing on the growing unpopularity of Richard III (King of England from 1483), she was able to forge an alliance with discontented Yorkists in support of her son. Two years after Richard III was crowned, Henry and Jasper sailed from the mouth of the Seine to the Milford Haven Waterway and defeated Richard III at the Battle of Bosworth Field (22 August 1485). Upon this victory, Henry Tudor proclaimed himself King Henry VII.

Henry VII

Upon becoming king in 1485, Henry VII moved rapidly to secure his hold on the throne. On 18 January 1486 at Westminster, he honoured a pledge made three years earlier and married Elizabeth of York (daughter of King Edward IV). They were third cousins, as both were great-great-grandchildren of John of Gaunt. The marriage unified the warring houses of Lancaster and York and gave the couple's children a strong claim to the throne. The unification of the two houses through this marriage is symbolized by the heraldic emblem of the Tudor rose, a combination of the white rose of York and the red rose of Lancaster.

Henry VII and Elizabeth of York had several children, four of whom survived infancy:

 Arthur, Prince of Wales (born 1486, died 1502)
 Henry, Duke of York (born 1491, died 1547)
 Margaret (born 1489, died 1541), who married James IV of Scotland
 Mary (born 1496, died 1533), who married Louis XII of France

Henry VII's foreign policy had an objective of dynastic security: witness the alliance forged with the marriage in 1503 of his daughter Margaret to James IV of Scotland and through the marriage of his eldest son. In 1501 Henry VII married his son Arthur to Catherine of Aragon, cementing an alliance with the Spanish monarchs, Ferdinand II of Aragon and Isabella I of Castile. The newlyweds spent their honeymoon at Ludlow Castle, the traditional seat of the Prince of Wales. However, four months after the marriage, Arthur died, leaving his younger brother Henry as heir apparent. Henry VII acquired a papal dispensation allowing Prince Henry to marry Arthur's widow; however, Henry VII delayed the marriage.

Henry VII limited his involvement in European politics. He went to war only twice: once in 1489 during the Breton crisis and the invasion of Brittany, and in 1496–1497 in revenge for Scottish support of Perkin Warbeck and for the Scottish invasion of northern England. Henry VII made peace with France in 1492 and the war against Scotland was abandoned because of the Western Rebellion of 1497. Henry VII came to peace with James IV in 1502, paving the way for the marriage of his daughter Margaret.

One of the main concerns of Henry VII during his reign was the re-accumulation of the funds in the royal treasury. England had never been one of the wealthier European countries, and after the War of the Roses this was even more true. Through his strict monetary strategy, he was able to leave a considerable amount of money in the Treasury for his son and successor, Henry VIII. Although it is debated whether Henry VII was a great king, he certainly was a successful one if only because he restored the nation's finances, strengthened the judicial system and successfully denied all other claimants to the throne, thus further securing it for his heir.

Henry VIII

The new King Henry VIII succeeded to the throne on 22 April 1509. He married Catherine of Aragon on 11 June 1509; they were crowned at Westminster Abbey on 24 June the same year. Catherine had been the wife of Henry's older brother Arthur (died 1502); this fact made the course of their marriage a rocky one from the start. A papal dispensation had to be granted for Henry to be able to marry Catherine, and the negotiations took some time. Despite the fact that Henry's father died before he was married to Catherine, he was determined to marry her anyway and to make sure that everyone knew he intended on being his own master.

When Henry first came to the throne, he had very little interest in actually ruling; rather, he preferred to indulge in luxuries and to partake in sports. He let others control the kingdom for the first two years of his reign, and then when he became more interested in military strategy, he took more interest in ruling his own realm. In his younger years, Henry was described as a man of gentle friendliness, gentle in debate, and who acted as more of a companion than a king. He was tall, handsome and cultured and generous in his gifts and affection and was said to be easy to get along with. The Henry that many people picture when they hear his name is the Henry of his later years, when he became obese, volatile, and was known for his great cruelty.

Catherine did not bear Henry the sons he was desperate for; her first child, a daughter, was stillborn, and her second child, a son named Henry, Duke of Cornwall, died 52 days after birth. A further set of stillborn children followed, until a daughter, Mary, was born in 1516. When it became clear to Henry that the Tudor line was at risk, he consulted his chief minister Cardinal Thomas Wolsey about the possibility of annulling his marriage to Catherine. Along with Henry's concern that he would not have an heir, it was also obvious to his court that he was becoming tired of his aging wife, who was six years older than he was. Wolsey visited Rome, where he hoped to get the Pope's consent for an annulment. However, the Holy See was reluctant to rescind the earlier papal dispensation and felt heavy pressure from Catherine's nephew, Charles V, Holy Roman Emperor, in support of his aunt. Catherine contested the proceedings, and a protracted legal battle followed. Wolsey fell from favour in 1529 as a result of his failure to procure the annulment, and Henry appointed Thomas Cromwell in his place as chief minister .

Despite his failure to produce the results that Henry wanted, Wolsey actively pursued the annulment (divorce was synonymous with annulment at that time). However, Wolsey never planned that Henry would marry Anne Boleyn, with whom the king had become enamoured while she served as a lady-in-waiting in Queen Catherine's household. It is unclear how far Wolsey was actually responsible for the English Reformation, but it is very clear that Henry's desire to marry Anne Boleyn precipitated the schism with Rome. Henry's concern about having an heir to secure his family line and to increase his security while alive would have prompted him to ask for a divorce sooner or later, whether Anne had precipitated it or not. Only Wolsey's sudden death at Leicester
on 29 November 1530 on his journey to the Tower of London saved him from the public humiliation and inevitable execution he would have suffered upon his arrival at the Tower.

Break with Rome

In order to allow Henry to divorce his wife and marry Anne Boleyn, the English parliament enacted laws breaking ties with Rome, and declaring the king Supreme Head of the Church of England (from Elizabeth I the monarch is known as the Supreme Governor of the Church of England), thus severing the ecclesiastical structure of England from the Catholic Church and the Pope. The newly appointed Archbishop of Canterbury, Thomas Cranmer, was then able to declare Henry's marriage to Catherine annulled. Catherine was removed from Court, and she spent the last three years of her life in various English houses under "protectorship", similar to house arrest. This allowed Henry to marry one of his courtiers: Anne Boleyn, the daughter of a minor diplomat Sir Thomas Boleyn. Anne had become pregnant by the end of 1532 and gave birth on 7 September 1533 to Elizabeth, named in honour of Henry's mother. Anne may have had later pregnancies which ended in miscarriage or stillbirth. In May 1536, Anne was arrested, along with six courtiers. Thomas Cromwell stepped in again, claiming that Anne had taken lovers during her marriage to Henry, and she was tried for high treason and incest; these charges were most likely fabricated, but she was found guilty and executed in May 1536.

Protestant alliance

Henry married again, for the third time, to Jane Seymour, the daughter of a Wiltshire knight, and with whom he had become enamoured while she was still a lady-in-waiting to Queen Anne. Jane became pregnant, and in 1537 produced a son, who became King Edward VI following Henry's death in 1547. Jane died of puerperal fever only a few days after the birth, leaving Henry devastated. Cromwell continued to gain the king's favour when he designed and pushed through the Laws in Wales Acts, uniting England and Wales.

In 1540, Henry married for the fourth time to the daughter of a Protestant German duke, Anne of Cleves, thus forming an alliance with the Protestant German states. Henry was reluctant to marry again, especially to a Protestant, but he was persuaded when the court painter Hans Holbein the Younger showed him a flattering portrait of her. She arrived in England in December 1539, and Henry rode to Rochester to meet her on 1 January 1540. Although the historian Gilbert Burnet claimed that Henry called her a Flanders Mare, there is no evidence that he said this; in truth, court ambassadors negotiating the marriage praised her beauty. Whatever the circumstances were, the marriage failed, and Anne agreed to a peaceful annulment, assumed the title My Lady, the King's Sister, and received a massive divorce settlement, which included Richmond Palace, Hever Castle, and numerous other estates across the country. Although the marriage made sense in terms of foreign policy, Henry was still enraged and offended by the match. Henry chose to blame Cromwell for the failed marriage, and ordered him beheaded on 28 July 1540. Henry kept his word and took care of Anne in his last years alive; however, after his death Anne suffered from extreme financial hardship because Edward VI's councillors refused to give her any funds and confiscated the homes she had been given. She pleaded to her brother to let her return home, but he only sent a few agents who tried to assist in helping her situation and refused to let her return home. Anne died on 16 July 1557 in Chelsea Manor.

The fifth marriage was to the Catholic Catherine Howard, the niece of Thomas Howard, the third Duke of Norfolk. Catherine was promoted by Norfolk in the hope that she would persuade Henry to restore the Catholic religion in England. Henry called her his "rose without a thorn", but the marriage ended in failure. Henry's fancy with Catherine started before the end of his marriage with Anne when she was still a member of Anne's court. Catherine was young and vivacious, but Henry's age made him less inclined to use Catherine in the bedroom; rather, he preferred to admire her, which Catherine soon grew tired of. Catherine, forced into a marriage to an unattractive, obese man over 30 years her senior, had never wanted to marry Henry, and conducted an affair with the King's favourite, Thomas Culpeper, while Henry and she were married. During her questioning, Catherine first denied everything but eventually she was broken down and told of her infidelity and her pre-nuptial relations with other men. Henry, first enraged, threatened to torture her to death but later became overcome with grief and self-pity. She was accused of treason and was executed on 13 February 1542, destroying the English Catholic holdouts' hopes of a national reconciliation with the Catholic Church. Her execution also marked the end of the Howard family's power within the court.

By the time Henry conducted another Protestant marriage with his final wife Catherine Parr in 1543, the old Roman Catholic advisers, including the powerful third Duke of Norfolk, had lost all their power and influence. The duke himself was still a committed Catholic, and he was nearly persuaded to arrest Catherine for preaching Lutheran doctrines to Henry while she attended his ill health. However, she managed to reconcile with the King after vowing that she had only argued about religion with him to take his mind off the suffering caused by his ulcerous leg. Her peacemaking also helped reconcile Henry with his daughters Mary and Elizabeth and fostered a good relationship between her and the crown prince.

Edward VI: Protestant zeal

Henry died on 28 January 1547. His will had reinstated his daughters by his annulled marriages to Catherine of Aragon and Anne Boleyn to the line of succession. Edward, his nine-year-old son by Jane Seymour, succeeded as Edward VI of England. Unfortunately, the young King's kingdom was usually in turmoil between nobles who were trying to strengthen their own positions in the kingdom by using the Regency in their favour.

Duke of Somerset's England

Although Henry had specified a group of men to act as regents during Edward's minority, Edward Seymour, Edward's uncle, quickly seized complete control and created himself Duke of Somerset on 15 February 1547. His domination of the Privy Council, the king's most senior body of advisers, was unchallenged. Somerset aimed to unite England and Scotland by marrying Edward to the young Mary, Queen of Scots, and aimed to forcibly impose the English Reformation on the Church of Scotland. Somerset led a large and well equipped army to Scotland, where he and the Scottish regent James Hamilton, 2nd Earl of Arran, commanded their armies at the Battle of Pinkie Cleugh on 10 September 1547. The English won the battle, and after this Queen Mary of Scotland was smuggled to France, where she was betrothed to the Dauphin, the future King Francis II of France. Despite Somerset's disappointment that no Scottish marriage would take place, his victory at Pinkie Cleugh made his position appear unassailable.

Edward VI was taught that he had to lead religious reform. In 1549, the Crown ordered the publication of the Book of Common Prayer, containing the forms of worship for daily and Sunday church services. The controversial new book was not welcomed by either reformers or Catholic conservatives; it was especially condemned in Devon and Cornwall, where traditional Catholic loyalty was at its strongest. In Cornwall at the time, many of the people could only speak the Cornish language, so the uniform English Bibles and church services were not understood by many. This caused the Prayer Book Rebellion, in which groups of Cornish non-conformists gathered round the mayor. The rebellion worried Somerset, now Lord Protector, and he sent an army to impose a military solution to the rebellion. The rebellion hardened the Crown against Catholics. Fear of Catholicism focused on Edward's elder sister, Mary, who was a pious and devout Catholic. Although called before the Privy Council several times to renounce her faith and stop hearing the Catholic Mass, she refused. Edward had a good relationship with his sister Elizabeth, who was a Protestant, albeit a moderate one, but this was strained when Elizabeth was accused of having an affair with the Duke of Somerset's brother, Thomas Seymour, 1st Baron Seymour of Sudeley, the husband of Henry's last wife Catherine Parr. Elizabeth was interviewed by one of Edward's advisers, and she was eventually found not to be guilty, despite forced confessions from her servants Catherine Ashley and Thomas Parry. Thomas Seymour was arrested and beheaded on 20 March 1549.

Problematic succession

Lord Protector Somerset was also losing favour. After forcibly removing Edward VI to Windsor Castle, with the intention of keeping him hostage, Somerset was removed from power by members of the council, led by his chief rival, John Dudley, the first Earl of Warwick, who created himself Duke of Northumberland shortly after his rise. Northumberland effectively became Lord Protector, but he did not use this title, learning from the mistakes his predecessor made. Northumberland was furiously ambitious, and aimed to secure Protestant uniformity while making himself rich with land and money in the process. He ordered churches to be stripped of all traditional Catholic symbolism, resulting in the simplicity often seen in Church of England churches today. A revision of the Book of Common Prayer was published in 1552. When Edward VI became ill in 1553, his advisers looked to the possible imminent accession of the Catholic Lady Mary, and feared that she would overturn all the reforms made during Edward's reign. Perhaps surprisingly, it was the dying Edward himself who feared a return to Catholicism, and wrote a new will repudiating the 1544 will of Henry VIII. This gave the throne to his cousin Lady Jane Grey, the granddaughter of Henry VIII's sister Mary Tudor, who, after the death of Louis XII of France in 1515 had married Henry VIII's favourite Charles Brandon, the first Duke of Suffolk.

With the death of Edward VI, the direct male line of the House of Tudor ended.

Jane: The nine days' queen
The dying Edward VI, under the pressure of John Dudley, the Duke of Northumberland, named his cousin Lady Jane Grey his successor due to her fervent Protestant beliefs. Edward's reluctance to follow the line of succession, which named his half-sister Mary as next in line, stemmed from his knowledge that Mary, firmly Catholic, would restore England to a Catholic nation. Lady Jane Grey was consistently at court after her father was made Duke of Suffolk in October 1551. Her mother, Lady Frances Brandon, was the daughter of Mary Tudor, Queen of France, youngest sister of Henry VIII. On 21 May 1553, Jane was married to John Dudley's son, Lord Guildford Dudley. This was a political move organised by the Duke to ensure that Protestantism stayed the national religion if Jane were to become queen. Edward died on 6 July 1553 and fifteen-year-old Jane, who fainted when she heard the news, was made queen on 10 July. However, despite the efforts of the Duke of Northumberland and Jane's father, the Duke of Suffolk, the public's support was with Princess Mary, the rightful heir according to Henry VIII's will. On 19 July Suffolk persuaded his daughter to relinquish the throne, which she had never wanted, to Mary. Mary's supporters joined her in a triumphal procession to London, accompanied by her younger sister Elizabeth. Lady Jane and her father were arrested for high treason and imprisoned in the Tower of London. Her father was pardoned, but his participation in Wyatt's rebellion led to his death shortly after. Jane and her husband Lord Guildford were sentenced to death and beheaded on 12 February 1554. Jane was only sixteen years old, and the cruel way in which her life had been lost for a throne she never desired aroused much sympathy among the public.

Mary I: A troubled queen's reign

Mary soon announced her intention to marry the Spanish prince Philip, son of her mother's nephew Charles V, Holy Roman Emperor. The prospect of a marriage alliance with Spain proved unpopular with the English people, who were worried that Spain would use England as a satellite, involving England in wars without the popular support of the people. Popular discontent grew; a Protestant courtier, Thomas Wyatt the younger, led a rebellion against Mary aiming to depose and replace her with her half-sister Elizabeth. The plot was discovered, and Wyatt's supporters were hunted down and killed. Wyatt himself was tortured, in the hope that he would give evidence that Elizabeth was involved so that Mary could have her executed for treason. Wyatt never implicated Elizabeth, and he was beheaded. Elizabeth spent her time between different prisons, including the Tower of London.

Mary married Philip at Winchester Cathedral, on 25 July 1554, and he thereby became king jure uxoris until her death. Philip found her unattractive, and only spent a minimal amount of time with her. Despite Mary believing she was pregnant numerous times during her five-year reign, she never bore children. Devastated that she rarely saw her husband, and anxious that she was not bearing an heir to Catholic England, Mary became bitter. In her determination to restore England to the Catholic faith and to secure her throne from Protestant threats, she had 200–300 Protestants burnt at the stake in the Marian Persecutions between 1555 and 1558. Protestants came to hate her as "Bloody Mary." Charles Dickens stated that "as bloody Queen Mary this woman has become famous, and as Bloody Queen Mary she will ever be remembered with horror and detestation".

Mary's dream of a new, Catholic Habsburg line was finished, and her popularity further declined when she lost Calais — the last English area on French soil — to Francis, Duke of Guise, on 7 January 1558. Mary's reign, however, introduced a new coining system that would be used until the 18th century, and her marriage to Philip II created new trade routes for England. Mary's government took a number of steps towards reversing the inflation, budgetary deficits, poverty, and trade crisis of her kingdom. She explored the commercial potential of Russian, African, and Baltic markets, revised the customs system, worked to counter the currency debasements of her predecessors, amalgamated several revenue courts, and strengthened the governing authority of the middling and larger towns. Mary also welcomed the first Russian ambassador to England, creating relations between England and Russia for the first time. Had she lived a little longer, Catholicism, which she worked so hard to restore into the realm might have taken deeper roots than it did. However, her actions in pursuit of this goal arguably spurred on the Protestant cause, through the many people she killed. Mary died on 17 November 1558 at the relatively young age of 42.

Elizabeth I: Age of intrigues and plots

Elizabeth I, who was staying at Hatfield House at the time of her accession, rode to London to the cheers of both the ruling class and the common people.

When Elizabeth came to the throne, there was much apprehension among members of the council appointed by Mary, because many of them (as noted by the Spanish ambassador) had participated in several plots against Elizabeth, such as her imprisonment in the Tower, trying to force her to marry a foreign prince and thereby sending her out of the realm, and even pushing for her death. In response to their fear, she chose as her chief minister Sir William Cecil, a Protestant, and former secretary to Lord Protector the Duke of Somerset and then to the Duke of Northumberland. Under Mary, he had been spared, and often visited Elizabeth, ostensibly to review her accounts and expenditure. Elizabeth also appointed her personal favourite, the son of the Duke of Northumberland Lord Robert Dudley, her Master of the Horse, giving him constant personal access to the queen.

Early years
Elizabeth had a long, turbulent path to the throne. She had a number of problems during her childhood, one of the main ones being after the execution of her mother, Anne Boleyn. When Anne was beheaded, Henry declared Elizabeth an illegitimate child and she would, therefore, not be able to inherit the throne. After the death of her father, she was raised by his widow, Catherine Parr and her husband Thomas Seymour, 1st Baron Seymour of Sudeley. A scandal arose with her and the Lord Admiral to which she stood trial. During the examinations, she answered truthfully and boldly and all charges were dropped. She was an excellent student, well-schooled in Latin, French, Italian, and somewhat in Greek, and was a talented writer. She was supposedly a very skilled musician as well, in both singing and playing the lute. After the rebellion of Thomas Wyatt the younger, Elizabeth was imprisoned in the Tower of London. No proof could be found that Elizabeth was involved and she was released and retired to the countryside until the death of her sister, Mary I of England.

Imposing the Church of England
Elizabeth was a moderate Protestant; she was the daughter of Anne Boleyn, who played a key role in the English Reformation in the 1520s. She had been brought up by Blanche Herbert Lady Troy. At her coronation in January 1559, many of the bishops – Catholic, appointed by Mary, who had expelled many of the Protestant clergymen when she became queen in 1553 – refused to perform the service in English. Eventually, the relatively minor Bishop of Carlisle, Owen Oglethorpe, performed the ceremony; but when Oglethorpe attempted to perform traditional Catholic parts of the Coronation, Elizabeth got up and left. Following the Coronation, two important Acts were passed through parliament: the Act of Uniformity and the Act of Supremacy, establishing the Protestant Church of England and creating Elizabeth Supreme Governor of the Church of England (Supreme Head, the title used by her father and brother, was seen as inappropriate for a woman ruler). These acts, known collectively as the Elizabethan Religious Settlement, made it compulsory to attend church services every Sunday; and imposed an oath on clergymen and statesmen to recognise the Church of England, the independence of the Church of England from the Catholic Church, and the authority of Elizabeth as Supreme Governor. Elizabeth made it clear that if they refused the oath the first time, they would have a second opportunity, after which, if the oath was not sworn, the offenders would be deprived of their offices and estates.

Pressure to marry

Even though Elizabeth was only twenty-five when she came to the throne, she was absolutely sure of her God-given place to be the queen and of her responsibilities as the 'handmaiden of the Lord'. She never let anyone challenge her authority as queen, even though many people, who felt she was weak and should be married, tried to do so. The popularity of Elizabeth was extremely high, but her Privy Council, her Parliament and her subjects thought that the unmarried queen should take a husband; it was generally accepted that, once a queen regnant was married, the husband would relieve the woman of the burdens of head of state. Also, without an heir, the Tudor line would end; the risk of civil war between rival claimants was a possibility if Elizabeth died childless. Numerous suitors from nearly all European nations sent ambassadors to English court to put forward their suit. Risk of death came dangerously close in 1564 when Elizabeth caught smallpox; when she was most at risk, she named Robert Dudley as Lord Protector in the event of her death. After her recovery, she appointed Dudley to the Privy Council and created him Earl of Leicester, in the hope that he would marry Mary, Queen of Scots. Mary rejected him, and instead married Henry Stuart, Lord Darnley, a descendant of Henry VII, giving Mary a stronger claim to the English throne. Although many Catholics were loyal to Elizabeth, many also believed that, because Elizabeth was declared illegitimate after her parents' marriage was annulled, Mary was the strongest legitimate claimant. Despite this, Elizabeth would not name Mary her heir; as she had experienced during the reign of her predecessor Mary I, the opposition could flock around the heir if they were disheartened with Elizabeth's rule.

Numerous threats to the Tudor line occurred during Elizabeth's reign. In 1569, a group of Earls led by Charles Neville, the sixth Earl of Westmorland, and Thomas Percy, the seventh Earl of Northumberland attempted to depose Elizabeth and replace her with Mary, Queen of Scots. In 1571, the Protestant-turned-Catholic Thomas Howard, the fourth Duke of Norfolk, had plans to marry Mary, Queen of Scots, and then replace Elizabeth with Mary. The plot, masterminded by Roberto di Ridolfi, was discovered and Norfolk was beheaded. The next major uprising was in 1601, when Robert Devereux, the second Earl of Essex, attempted to raise the city of London against Elizabeth's government. The city of London proved unwilling to rebel; Essex and most of his co-rebels were executed. Threats also came from abroad. In 1570, Pope Pius V issued a Papal bull, Regnans in Excelsis, excommunicating Elizabeth, and releasing her subjects from their allegiance to her. Elizabeth came under pressure from Parliament to execute Mary, Queen of Scots, to prevent any further attempts to replace her; though faced with several official requests, she vacillated over the decision to execute an anointed queen. Finally, she was persuaded of Mary's (treasonous) complicity in the plotting against her, and she signed the death warrant in 1586. Mary was executed at Fotheringhay Castle on 8 February 1587, to the outrage of Catholic Europe.

There are many reasons debated as to why Elizabeth never married. It was rumoured that she was in love with Robert Dudley, 1st Earl of Leicester, and that on one of her summer progresses she had birthed his illegitimate child. This rumour was just one of many that swirled around the two's long-standing friendship. However, more important to focus on were the disasters that many women, such as her mother Anne Boleyn, suffered due to being married into the royal family. Her sister Mary's marriage to Philip brought great contempt to the country, for many of her subjects despised Spain and Philip and feared that he would try to take complete control. Recalling her father's disdain for Anne of Cleves, Elizabeth also refused to enter into a foreign match with a man that she had never seen before, so that also eliminated a large number of suitors.

Last hopes for a Tudor heir

Despite the uncertainty of Elizabeth's – and therefore the Tudors' – hold on England, she never married. The closest she came to marriage was between 1579 and 1581, when she was courted by Francis, Duke of Anjou, the son of Henry II of France and Catherine de' Medici. Despite Elizabeth's government constantly begging her to marry in the early years of her reign, it was now persuading Elizabeth not to marry the French prince, for his mother, Catherine de' Medici, was suspected of ordering the St Bartholomew's Day massacre of tens of thousands of French Protestant Huguenots in 1572. Elizabeth bowed to public feeling against the marriage, learning from the mistake her sister, Mary I, made when she married Philip II of Spain, and sent the Duke of Anjou away. Elizabeth knew that the continuation of the Tudor line was now impossible; she was forty-eight in 1581, and too old to bear children.

By far the most dangerous threat to the Tudor line during Elizabeth's reign was the Spanish Armada of 1588, launched by Elizabeth's old suitor Philip II of Spain and commanded by Alonso de Guzmán El Bueno, the seventh Duke of Medina Sidonia. The Spanish invasion fleet outnumbered the English fleet's 22 galleons and 108 armed merchant ships. The Spanish lost, however, as a result of bad weather on the English Channel, poor planning and logistics, and the skills of Sir Francis Drake and Charles Howard, the second Baron Howard of Effingham (later first Earl of Nottingham).

While Elizabeth declined physically with age, her running of the country continued to benefit her people. In response to famine across England due to bad harvests in the 1590s, Elizabeth introduced the poor law, allowing peasants who were too ill to work a certain amount of money from the state. All the money Elizabeth had borrowed from Parliament in 12 of the 13 parliamentary sessions was paid back; by the time of her death, Elizabeth not only had no debts, but was in credit. Elizabeth died childless at Richmond Palace on 24 March 1603. She left behind a legacy and monarchy worth noting. She had pursued her goals of being well endowed with every aspect of ruling her kingdom, and of knowing everything necessary to be an effective monarch. She took part in law, economics, politics and governmental issues both domestic and abroad. Realms that had once been strictly forbidden to the female gender had now been ruled by one.

Elizabeth never named a successor. However, her chief minister Sir Robert Cecil had corresponded with the Protestant King James VI of Scotland, great-grandson of Margaret Tudor, and James's succession to the English throne was unopposed. There has been discussion over the selected heir. It has been argued that Elizabeth would have selected James because she felt guilty about what happened to his mother, her cousin. Whether this is true is unknown for certain, for Elizabeth did her best to never show emotion nor give in to claims. Elizabeth was strong and hard-headed and kept her primary goal in sight: providing the best for her people and proving those wrong who doubted her while maintaining a straight composure.

The House of Tudor survives through the female line, first with the House of Stuart, which occupied the English throne for most of the following century, and then the House of Hanover, via James' granddaughter Sophia. King Charles III, a member of the House of Windsor, is a direct descendant of Henry VII.

Before and after comparisons

Public interference regarding the Roses dynasties was always a threat until the 17th century Stuart/Bourbon re-alignment occasioned by a series of events such as the execution of Lady Jane Grey, despite her brother-in-law, Leicester's reputation in Holland, the Rising of the North (in which the old Percy-Neville feud and even anti-Scottish sentiment was discarded on account of religion; Northern England shared the same Avignonese bias as the Scottish court, on par with Valois France and Castile, which became the backbone of the Counter-Reformation, with Protestants being solidly anti-Avignonese) and death of Elizabeth I of England without children.

The Tudors made no substantial changes in their foreign policy from either Lancaster or York, whether the alliance was with Aragon or Cleves, the chief foreign enemies continuing as the Auld Alliance, but the Tudors resurrected old ecclesiastic arguments once pursued by Henry II of England and his son John of England. Yorkists were tied so much to the old order that Catholic rebellions (such as the Pilgrimage of Grace) and aspirations (exemplified by William Allen) were seen as continuing in their reactionary footsteps, when in opposition to the Tudors' reformation policies, although the Tudors were not uniformly Protestant according to Continental definition—instead were true to their Lancastrian Beaufort allegiance, in the appointment of Reginald Pole.

The essential difference between the Tudors and their predecessors, is the nationalization and integration of John Wycliffe's ideas to the Church of England, holding onto the alignment of Richard II of England and Anne of Bohemia, in which Anne's Hussite brethren were in alliance to her husband's Wycliffite countrymen against the Avignon Papacy. The Tudors otherwise rejected or suppressed other religious notions, whether for the Pope's award of Fidei Defensor or to prevent them from being in the hands of the common laity, who might be swayed by cells of foreign Protestants, with whom they had conversation as Marian exiles, pursuing a strategy of containment which the Lancastrians had done (after being vilified by Wat Tyler), even though the phenomenon of "Lollard knights" (like John Oldcastle) had become almost a national sensation all on its own.

In essence, the Tudors followed a composite of Lancastrian (the court party) and Yorkist (the church party) policies. Henry VIII tried to extend his father's balancing act between the dynasties for opportunistic interventionism in the Italian Wars, which had unfortunate consequences for his own marriages and the Papal States; the King furthermore tried to use similar tactics for the "via media" concept of Anglicanism. A further parallelism was effected by turning Ireland into a kingdom and sharing the same episcopal establishment as England, whilst enlarging England by the annexation of Wales. The progress to Northern/Roses government would thenceforth pass across the border into Scotland, in 1603, due not only to the civil warring, but also because the Tudors' own line was fragile and insecure, trying to reconcile the mortal enemies who had weakened England to the point of having to bow to new pressures, rather than dictate diplomacy on English terms.

Rebellions against the Tudors
The following English rebellions took place against the House of Tudor:
 Yorkist risings against Henry VII (1486–1487)
 The first was the Rebellion of the Stafford brothers and Viscount Lovell of 1486, which collapsed without fighting.
 In 1487, Yorkists led by John, Earl of Lincoln rebelled in support of Lambert Simnel, a boy who was claimed to be the Earl of Warwick, son of Edward IV's brother Clarence (who had last been seen as a prisoner in the Tower). The rebellion began in Ireland, where the traditionally Yorkist nobility, headed by the powerful Gerald, Earl of Kildare, proclaimed Simnel King and provided troops for his invasion of England. The rebellion was defeated and Lincoln killed at the Battle of Stoke.
 Yorkshire Rebellion (1489) — Rioting led by Sir John Egremont was suppressed by Thomas, Earl of Surrey but not before Henry, Earl of Northumberland was killed collecting taxes for the War in Brittany. 
 Cornish Rebellion (1497) 
 Second Cornish Uprising of 1497 — Perkin Warbeck, who claimed to be Richard, the younger of the "Princes in the Tower", landed in Cornwall with a few thousand troops, but was soon captured and executed in 1499.
 Rebellions against Henry VIII
 The Amicable Grant Rebellion (1525)
 The Pilgrimage of Grace (1536)
 Rebellions against Edward VI's "protectors"
 The Western Rebellion or Prayer Book Rebellion (1549)
 Kett's Rebellion (1549)
 Rebellions against Mary I
 Wyatt's Rebellion (1554)
 Rebellions against Elizabeth I
 The Rebellion of the Northern Earls (1569)
 The Essex Rebellion (1601)

Tudor monarchs of England and Ireland
The six Tudor monarchs were:

Armorial

Before the succession

Coat of arms as sovereigns

As Prince of Wales, Arthur, Henry, and Edward all bore these arms,

Tudor badges
The Welsh Dragon supporter honoured the Tudors' Welsh origins. The most popular symbol of the house of Tudor was the Tudor rose (see top of page). When Henry Tudor took the crown of England from Richard III in battle, he brought about the end of the Wars of the Roses between the House of Lancaster (whose badge was a red rose) and the House of York (whose badge was a white rose). He married Elizabeth of York to bring all factions together.

On his marriage, Henry adopted the Tudor Rose badge conjoining the White Rose of York and the Red Rose of Lancaster. It symbolized the Tudor's right to rule as well the uniting of the kingdom after the Wars of the Roses. It has been used by every English, then British, monarch since Henry VII as a royal badge.

Tudor Monograms
The Tudors also used monograms to denote themselves:

Lineage and the Tudor name

The Tudor Name
As noted above Tewdur or Tudor is derived from the words tud "territory" and rhi "king". Owen Tudor took it as a surname on being knighted. It is doubtful whether the Tudor kings used the name on the throne. Kings and princes were not seen as needing a name, and a " 'Tudor' name for the royal family was hardly known in the sixteenth century. The royal surname was never used in official publications, and hardly in 'histories' of various sorts before 1584. ... Monarchs were not anxious to publicize their descent in the paternal line from a Welsh adventurer, stressing instead continuity with the historic English and French royal families. Their subjects did not think of them as 'Tudors', or of themselves as 'Tudor people'". Princes and Princesses would have been known as "of England". The medieval practice of colloquially calling princes after their place birth (e.g. Henry of Bolingbroke for Henry IV or Henry of Monmouth for Henry V) was not followed. Henry VII was likely known as "Henry of Richmond" before his taking of the throne. When Richard III called him "Henry Tudor" it was to stress his Welshness and his unfitness for the throne as opposed to himself, "Richard Plantagenet", a "true" descendant of the royal line.

Patrilineal descent

Royal lineage

The Tudors' claim to the throne combined the Lancastrian claim in their descent from the Beauforts and the Yorkist claim by the marriage of Henry VII to the heiress of Edward IV.

 – King of England  – Scottish Royal Family

 – House of Lancaster
 – House of York

 – House of Tudor
 – Tudor king or queen of England

In popular culture
Numerous feature films are based on Tudor history. Queen Elizabeth has been in special favorite for filmmakers for generations. According to Elizabeth A. Ford and Deborah C. Mitchell, images of Elizabeth I move: "fast-forward across film history, unforgettable, iconic images: the stately bearing; the red wigs; the high forehead; the long, aristocratic nose; the alabaster makeup; the pearl-drop earrings; the stiff, ornate ruffs; the fingers dripping with jewels; and the gowns, with yards and yards of white satin, purple velvet, gold, and silver ornamented and sparkling with rubies, diamonds, and more pearls. Even a schoolchild would be hard-pressed to mistake her for any other monarch."

 The Private Lives of Elizabeth and Essex (1939), film starring Bette Davis, Errol Flynn and Olivia de Havilland
 A Man for All Seasons, a play by Robert Bolt produced for radio, television and stage which premiered in 1960
 A Man for All Seasons (1966 film)
 A Man for All Seasons (1988 film)
 Anne of the Thousand Days (1969), British costume drama
 Elizabeth R (1971), BBC television drama serial
 Elizabeth (1998), film starring Cate Blanchett
 Elizabeth: The Golden Age (2007), sequel
 The Other Boleyn Girl (2001), a historical novel by Philippa Gregory, based on Mary Boleyn, the sister of Queen Anne Boleyn
 The Other Boleyn Girl (2003 film)
 The Other Boleyn Girl (2008 film)
 Henry VIII (2003), a two-part British television serial starring Ray Winstone
 Elizabeth I (2005), television drama
 The Virgin Queen (2005), a BBC and Power co-production, four-part miniseries based upon the life of Queen Elizabeth I, starring Anne-Marie Duff
 The Tudors (2007–2010), a British-/Irish-/Canadian-produced historical fiction television series loosely based upon the reign of Henry VIII.
 The King's Daughter: A Novel of the First Tudor Queen (2008), by Sandra Worth, chronicles the origins of Tudor rule.
 Reign (TV series) (2013–2017), a four-season television series that is loosely based on the life of Mary, Queen of Scots and in later seasons, Elizabeth I of England.
 The White Princess (2017), an eight-episode series produced by Starz based on the novel by Philippa Gregory, which centers on the early reign of Henry VII and his Queen Elizabeth of York after his victory at the Battle of Bosworth, and the beginning of the Tudor period.
 Horrible Histories: Terrible Tudors
 The 2017 musical Six is inspired by the stories of Henry VIII's six wives.
 The 50-year special episode of Doctor Who "The Day of the Doctor" features Elizabeth I as one of secondary characters.
 Wolf Hall, Bring Up the Bodies and The Mirror and the Light: a trilogy of novels by Hilary Mantel, the first two of which were also adapted as Wolf Hall (TV series), which portray the dynastic, political and religious upheavals of the first part of the reign of Henry VIII from the viewpoint of Thomas Cromwell, for a time Henry's chief minister and adviser.

See also
 England and Wales
 Elizabethan era
 Mid-Tudor Crisis
 Richmond Castle
 Tudor architecture
 Tudor conquest of Ireland
 Tudor navy
 Tudor Revival architecture

References

Sources

Further reading
 
 Guy, John (ed). The Tudor Monarchy. St Martin's Press, 1997.
 Jones, Michael K. and Malcolm G. Underwood, "Beaufort, Margaret, countess of Richmond and Derby (1443–1509)", Oxford Dictionary of National Biography, Oxford University Press, 2004. Accessed 27 August 2007.
 
 Thomas, R. S. "Tudor, Edmund, first earl of Richmond (c.1430–1456)", Oxford Dictionary of National Biography, Oxford University Press, 2004. Accessed 27 August 2007.
 Turton, Godfrey. The Dragon’s Breed: The Story of the Tudors from Earliest Times to 1603. Peter Davies, 1970.
 The Wars of the Roses : peace and conflict in fifteenth-century England
 This realm of England, 1399 to 1688

External links

 History lectures, essays and lectures by John Guy
 Tudor treasures from The National Archives
 Tudor Place
 Tudor History
 The Tudors at the Royal Family website
 Tudor History
 "The Tudor delusion": an article in The Times Literary Supplement by Clifford S. L. Davies, arguing that we are wrong even to talk about "the Tudors", 11 June 2008.
 The Family Tree of the Tudors and the Stuarts in Pictures

 
Royal houses of England
 
1485 establishments in England
1603 disestablishments in England